Matthew Ebden and Samuel Groth won this tournament. They defeated Pavol Červenák and Ivo Klec 6–3, 3–6, [10–1] in the final.

Seeds

Draw

Draw

References
 Doubles draw

Doubles
2011